Charis is a given name derived from a Greek word meaning "grace, kindness, and life."

In Greek mythology, a Charis is one of the Charites or "Graces", goddesses of charm, beauty, nature, human creativity and fertility; and in Homer's Iliad, Charis is the wife of Hephaestus. Charis was also known as Cale ("Beauty") or Aglaea ("Splendor").

Charis is also the Spartan name of a Grace.

In the Greek and Hebrew biblical term Charis (χάρις) refers to good will, loving-kindness, favour, in particular to God's merciful grace. It is used over 140 times  in the New Testament and is a central concept in the theology developed by St. Augustine of Hippo.

It is used in the descriptive epithet of many plant genera and species. Including; Ammocharis (meaning sand and beauty), Eleocharis (meaning marsh and beauty), Englerocharis, Eucharis (meaning good and beauty), Hydrocharis (meaning water and beauty), Nomocharis, Argostemma phyllocharis (meaning leaf and beauty) and Pimelea ammocharis.

See also

 Charisma
 Charls

References

English feminine given names
Greek feminine given names
Greek masculine given names
New Testament Greek words and phrases